John Robert Hinton (June 19, 1876 – June 3, 1920), nicknamed "Red", was an American professional baseball third baseman who played four games for the Boston Beaneaters of Major League Baseball (MLB) in 1901. Hinton played 725 games in Minor League Baseball from 1898 to 1912.

References

External links 

Baseball players from Pennsylvania
1876 births
1920 deaths
Major League Baseball third basemen
Boston Beaneaters players
Lock Haven Normals players
Wheeling Stogies players
Uniontown Coal Barons players
Youngstown Champs players
Dayton Veterans players
East Liverpool Potters (baseball) players
Canton Deubers players
Norfolk Tars players
Lock Haven Maroons players